E.T.: Interplanetary Mission (known as E.T. the Extra-Terrestrial: The 20th Anniversary in Europe) is a PlayStation video game that is part of the E.T. the Extra-Terrestrial.

Gameplay

The player takes control of E.T in an isometric environment. E.T. is able to heal using his glowing finger, stun enemies using his stomach and lift/throw enemies using telekineses. The game also features puzzle elements.

Reception

The game has a rating of 50 on Metacritic based on 4 reviews.

TotalGames.net said "A lot better than anyone dared to imagine (damn that Atari ‘classic!’) – just don't expect the game to be as timeless and breathtaking as the movie and you'll have a good time".
 
PSX Nation wrote "A decent-enough scavenger hunt to amuse youngsters for quite a few hours of simple and repetitive item-gathering and level-clearing fun". GameZone commented "This is a nice little program, certainly not all that challenging, but delightful for its animation of a benign alien creature and its charming ways", and Official U.S. PlayStation Magazine said "It’s dreadfully ugly and unredeemingly unfun".

References

2002 video games
E.T. the Extra-Terrestrial video games
PlayStation (console) games
PlayStation (console)-only games
Video games developed in the United States
Ubisoft games
NewKidCo games
Single-player video games